Pablo Bonells Mendoza (born 9 September 1985) is a former Mexican footballer who last played for Puebla.

He joined the UNAM Pumas youth system at the age of 13, working his way through the ranks to make his first division debut in 2005.

References

External links
 
 

1985 births
Living people
Footballers from Mexico City
Association football forwards
Club Universidad Nacional footballers
Club León footballers
Querétaro F.C. footballers
Club Celaya footballers
Club Puebla players
Liga MX players
Mexican footballers